Universiade
2003 Summer Universiade
2003
2003
2003 in South Korean football